Tony Sancho is a stage and film / television actor based in Los Angeles best known for his lead role as Isaac in Tadeo Garcia's debut film On the Downlow also featuring starring Michael Cortez as Angel.

Biography 
Tony Sancho has a background on the theatre stage as member of Teatro Vista, the only Equity Latino theatre company in the Midwest. He played the role of Ritchie Valens in Buddy: The Buddy Holly Story that played on the Drury Lane Theater, as Lazado in the Teatro Vista production of Octavio Solis's Dreamlandia that played in the Victory Gardens Theater. He played Cheche in Nilo Cruz's Anna in the Tropics at the Goodman Theatre, as well as productions at Remy Bumppo, Steppenwolf, The Journeymen Theater Company and Pegasus Players.

In 2010, he took part in Los Angeles in Octavio Solis's play Lydia in the role of Rene. The play was a production of Yale Repertory Theatre. He also took part in Muthafucker with Hat at the Ojai Playwrights Conference and in Need Theatre's production of Michael John Garces' The Web.

His film credits besides the award-winning On the Downlow include television credits in episodes of ER and The Forgotten.

Theatre
(selective) 
Buddy: The Buddy Holly Story as Ritchie Valens {Teatro Vista]
Dreamlandia [Teatro Vista]
Anna in the Tropics as Cheche
Lydia as Rene [Yale Repertory Theatre]
The Web [Need Theatre]

Filmography
2004: On the Downlow as Isaac
2005: The Trouble with Dee Dee as Busboy
2011: Hospitality as waiter (short)
2012: The Babymakers as Pedro
Television 
2007: ER (TV series) in 1 episode "Patients" as Emilio
2010: The Forgotten (TV series) in 1 episode "Living Doe" as Darryl Diaz

References

External links

American male film actors
American male stage actors
Living people
Year of birth missing (living people)